Prasiini is a tribe of cicadas in the family Cicadidae. There are about 9 genera and at least 50 described species in Prasiini, found in tropical Africa, Australasia, and the Neotropics.

Genera
These five genera belong to the tribe Prasiini:
 Arfaka Distant, 1905 c g
 Jacatra Distant, 1905 c g
 Lembeja Distant, 1892 c g
 Mariekea Jong & Boer, 2004 c g
 Prasia Stål, 1863 c g
Data sources: i = ITIS, c = Catalogue of Life, g = GBIF, b = Bugguide.net

References

Further reading

 
 
 
 
 
 
 
 
 
 

 
Cicadettinae
Hemiptera tribes